MobilityTestbed, formerly known as DARP Simulation Testbed, is an open-source, interaction-rich Multi-agent simulation model designed to test and evaluate various Dial-a-ride problem algorithms or other central or decentralized coordination or Resource allocation mechanisms within on-demand transportation systems. The testbed is built on top of the AgentPolis platform and employs a discrete event simulation paradigm.

See also

Dial-a-ride
Multi-agent simulation
Discrete event simulation
List of computer simulation software

References

External links
 MobilityTestbed on GitHub
 GitHub wiki and Tutorials

Free simulation software